The Gendarmerie Nationale, is the national gendarmerie force of the People's Democratic Republic of Algeria. As part of the Algerian Armed Forces is commanded by a major general who reports directly to the Minister of National Defense. It was created in 1962 by Decree No.019-62 of 23 August 1962 shortly after its independence. In 2012 the gendarmerie consists of 130,000 personnel. Although generally regarded as a versatile and competent paramilitary force, the gendarmerie has been severely tested in dealing with civil disorder since 1988. It frequently has lacked sufficient manpower at the scene of disorder and its units have been inadequately trained and equipped for riot control. The gendarmerie, however, has demonstrated the ability to root out terrorist groups operating from mountain hideouts.

The current commander is General Nouredine Gouasmia, who succeeded General Abderrahmane Arar in 2020.

Duties
The gendarmerie is responsible for maintaining law and order in villages, towns, and rural areas; providing security surveillance over local inhabitants; and representing government authority in remote regions, especially where tensions and conflicts have occurred in the past.

Organization
The gendarmerie is organized in battalions, whose component companies and platoons are dispersed to individual communities and desert outposts. Its regional headquarters are in the same cities as the six military regional headquarters with subdivisions in the forty-eight wilayat. It consists of a General Headquarters in Algiers and 6 subordinate Regional Commands (Divisions), plus 4 commands for Recruitment & Training, Intelligence, Administration and Detection. The 6 Regional Commands each command 3 to 4 "Brigades".

Several specialized units also exist within the gendarmerie, and were established to confront the increase in crimes and criminals:

 Administrative Unit
 Aerial Training Formation
 Border Guards Unit, created on November 17, 1977
 Cultural Heritage Protection Unit
 Environmental Protection Unit
 Juvenile Protection Brigade, created in 2011
 Security and Intervention Detachment
 Special Intervention Detachment, created on August 27, 1989

Equipment
A highly mobile force, the gendarmerie possesses a modern communications system connecting its various units with one another and with the army. Equipment includes light armored weapons and transport and patrol vehicles.

The force in 1993 had 44 Panhard M3 armored personnel carriers (an APC variant of the Panhard AML.).
50 Fahd armored personnel carriers, and 28 Mi-2 light helicopters and 10 AgustaWestland AW109, In addition to AS355 Ecureuil 2 helicopters.

Training
In addition to utilizing training provided by the French since independence, the gendarmerie operates its own schools for introductory and advanced studies. The gendarmerie's main training center is at Sidi Bel Abbes, The officers school is at Isser, about 80 kilometers east of Algiers.

Commandment
The commandment of gendarmerie was successively entrusted to:

See also
 Special Intervention Detachment
 Garde communale

Notes

Military of Algeria
Gendarmerie
Law enforcement in Algeria
Military units and formations established in 1962
1962 establishments in Algeria